Fogama'a Crater is a valley basin on Tutuila Island, American Samoa, immediately north of Larsen Bay. It is within the village of Futiga, just below Logotala Hill. It is also known as Hidden Beach or Larsen’s Cove.

It is a prominent crater on the island. The Fogama'a Crater National Natural Landmark contains 485 acres and was designated in 1972. It is scenic and geologically significant as the most recent illustration of volcanism in American Samoa. It is one of very few places where illustrations of the most recent episode of American Samoa volcanism can be seen.

The crater is situated immediately inland from Larsen Bay, which contains two smaller coves: Fagalua and Fogama'a. Fogama'a Cove is an idyllic and isolated beach on the inner margin of Larsen's Bay. There are extensive seabird breeding grounds in Larsen's Bay.

Fogama'a Crater National Natural Landmark is located next to Fagatele Bay and also includes Steps Point, the southernmost point of the island.

History

The nearby village of Vaitogi was previously located in the Fogama'a Crater, where the villagers had rich soil for farming and plenty of game for hunting. However, families began leaving the area at the end of the 19th century due to ease in connecting with other villages. The present-day location of the village was much closer to other villages when traveling on foot. Vaitogians often visit Fogama'a to enjoy the beach and bay.

See also
List of National Natural Landmarks in American Samoa

References

National Natural Landmarks in American Samoa
Tutuila